This is a list of the recordings of Gianni Schicchi, the third of a group of three one-act operas by Giacomo Puccini collectively known as Il trittico; the other operas are Il tabarro and Suor Angelica. The three were premiered at the Metropolitan Opera on 14 December 1918, and for the next three years were always played together. After 1921, however, Puccini agreed that the operas could be performed separately. Gianni Schicchi became the most popular and most frequently performed of the three, often paired with other works such as Maurice Ravel's L'heure espagnole and Richard Strauss's Salome.

Despite its popularity as a stage work, Gianni Schicchi was not available as a recording until after the Second World War, a neglect described by a Gramophone reviewer as "extraordinary". The first issued recording, an early LP release in 1950, was from a live performance at the Met on 12 March 1949. It was followed, also in 1950, by a recording from a Radio Turin broadcast; thereafter, recordings were issued at regular intervals on long-playing and, later, compact disc formats. The first VHS (videotape) was in 1983, since when several more DVD versions have been released. While the majority of recordings are based on the original Italian libretto, three German-language versions were issued in the 1970s. Opera stars who have featured in recordings include Giuseppe Di Stefano, Tito Gobbi, Victoria de los Ángeles, Renata Tebaldi, Dietrich Fischer-Dieskau, Plácido Domingo and Angela Gheorghiu.

Recordings
Many of the listed recordings have been issued under several labels. For audio recordings, only the first LP and the first CD issues are shown. For videos, the first VHS and DVD issues are shown. Unofficial recordings and pirate versions are not shown.

Audio

Video

References
Notes

Cited sources

Opera discographies
Operas by Giacomo Puccini